A meta model is used in metamodeling for software engineering.

Meta model may also refer to:

MODAF Meta-Model
Surrogate model, an approximating model in computer simulation